A lava lamp is a decorative lamp, invented in 1963 by British entrepreneur Edward Craven Walker, the founder of the lighting company Mathmos. It consists of a bolus of a special coloured wax mixture inside a glass vessel, the remainder of which contains clear or translucent liquid. The vessel is placed on a base containing an incandescent light bulb whose heat causes temporary reductions in the wax's density and the liquid's surface tension. As the warmed wax rises through the liquid, it cools, loses its buoyancy, and falls back to the bottom of the vessel in a cycle that is visually suggestive of pāhoehoe lava, hence the name. The lamps are designed in a variety of styles and colours.

Lava lamps are often associated with hippie culture and cannabis culture.

Operation

A classic lava lamp contains a standard incandescent or halogen lamp which heats a tall (often tapered) glass bottle. A formula from a 1968 US patent consisted of water and a transparent, translucent, or opaque mix of mineral oil, paraffin wax, and carbon tetrachloride.p. 2, line 30 The clear water or mineral oil can optionally be coloured with translucent dyes.

Common wax has a density much lower than that of water and would float on top at any temperature. However, carbon tetrachloride is denser than water (also nonflammable and miscible with wax) and is added to the wax to make its density at room temperature slightly higher than that of the water. When heated, the wax mixture becomes less dense than the water, because it expands more than water when both are heated.p. 1, lines 40 & 45  It also becomes fluid, causing blobs of it to ascend to the top of the lamp. There, they cool, increasing their density relative to that of the water, and descend.p. 1, line 47 A metallic wire coil in the bottle's base breaks the cooled blobs' surface tension, allowing them to recombine.

Since 1970, lava lamps made for the US market have not used carbon tetrachloride, whose use was banned that year due to toxicity. Haggerty, their current manufacturer, has stated that their current formulation is a trade secret.

The underlying fluid mechanics phenomenon in lava lamps is a form of Rayleigh–Taylor instability.

The bulb is normally 25 to 40 watts. It generally takes 45–60 minutes for the wax to warm up enough to form freely rising blobs, when operating the lamp at standard room temperature, and as long as 2 to 3 hours if the room is cooler.

Once the wax is molten, the lamp should not be agitated, or the two fluids may emulsify, and the fluid surrounding the wax blobs will remain cloudy rather than clear. Some recombination will occur as part of the normal cycle of the wax in the container, but the only way to recombine all of the wax is to turn off the lamp and wait for a few hours. The wax then settles back to the bottom, forming one blob once again. Severe cases can require many heating-cooling cycles to clear.

In 2015, a new design was introduced that uses ferrofluid in place of wax.

History

British entrepreneur Edward Craven Walker had the idea for the lava lamp in 1963 after watching a homemade egg timer, made from a cocktail shaker filled with liquids, as it bubbled on a stovetop in a pub. He hired British inventor David George Smith to develop the device and the chemical formula it required. Smith is credited as the inventor on the original  for a "Display Device" filed and assigned to Craven-Walker's company in 1965, and subsequently issued in 1968. Craven Walker's company, Crestworth, was based in Poole, Dorset, United Kingdom. He named the lamp "Astro" and had variations such as the "Astro Mini" and the "Astro Coach" lantern.

In 1965, Adolph Wertheimer and Hy Spector were intrigued by Walker's product when they saw it at a German trade show. They bought the American rights and began the Lava Manufacturing Corporation in Chicago to sell what they called the Lava Lite Lamp. In the late 1970s, US rights were sold to Larry Haggerty, who created a subsidiary of his company, Haggerty Enterprises, called Lava World International, which produced American lava lamps for over 30 years.

In 2003, American lava lamp maker Lava World International (formerly Lava-Simplex-Scribe Internationale) moved its production to China. In 2008, it was acquired by Talon Merchant Capital and its name was changed to Lava Lite LLC. As of 2016, lava lamps were being sold under Lifespan brands in North America. In 2018, the 'Lava Lamp' brand was acquired by toy and gift maker Schylling Inc. of North Andover, MA. who continue to hold the US trademark rights to both the shape and name of LAVA lamp.

When the American rights were sold, Craven Walker retained the rights for the rest of the world, and took on two business partners in the late 1980s, Cressida Granger and David Mulley. They eventually took over the company and changed its name to Mathmos in 1992. Edward Craven Walker remained a consultant to them until his death in 2000. Mathmos continues to make Lava Lamps and related products. They have won two Queens Awards for Export, and the Best Multi-Media prize at the Design Week awards. Astro lava lamp was launched in 1963 and celebrated its 50th anniversary in 2013. Mathmos lava lamps are still made in the original factory in Poole, Dorset.

See also
 Lava
 Lavarand, a random number generator that used lava lamps
 Plasma globe
 Bubble light

References

Further reading

External links

 How Do Lava Lamps Work? - from The Straight Dope
 How Liquid Motion Lamps Work - from howstuffworks.com
 What exactly is the goop inside a lava lamp? - from Technology Connections
 Lava lamps creators mark 50 years of 1960s icon - BBC News
 The history of the original lava lamp - Flow of lava

Products introduced in 1968
1960s fads and trends
1970s fads and trends
Brands that became generic
British inventions
Hippie movement
Novelty items
Articles containing video clips
Types of lamp
20th-century inventions